Saalfeld-Rudolstadt – Saale-Holzland-Kreis – Saale-Orla-Kreis is an electoral constituency (German: Wahlkreis) represented in the Bundestag. It elects one member via first-past-the-post voting. Under the current constituency numbering system, it is designated as constituency 195. It is located in eastern Thuringia, comprising the districts of Saalfeld-Rudolstadt, Saale-Holzland-Kreis, and Saale-Orla-Kreis.

Saalfeld-Rudolstadt – Saale-Holzland-Kreis – Saale-Orla-Kreis was created for the 2002 federal election. Since 2021, it has been represented by Michael Kaufmann of the Alternative for Germany (AfD).

Geography
Saalfeld-Rudolstadt – Saale-Holzland-Kreis – Saale-Orla-Kreis is located in eastern Thuringia. As of the 2021 federal election, it comprises the districts of Saalfeld-Rudolstadt, Saale-Holzland-Kreis, and Saale-Orla-Kreis.

History
Saalfeld-Rudolstadt – Saale-Holzland-Kreis – Saale-Orla-Kreis was created in 2002, then known as Sonneberg – Saalfeld-Rudolstadt – Saale-Orla-Kreis. It acquired its current name in the 2017 election. In the 2002 election, it was constituency 198 in the numbering system. In the 2005 election, it was number 197. In the 2009 and 2013 elections, it was number 196. Since the 2017 election, it has been number 195.

Originally, the constituency comprised the districts of Sonneberg, Saalfeld-Rudolstadt, and Saale-Orla-Kreis. It acquired its current borders in the 2017 election.

Members
The constituency was first represented by Christine Lehder of the Social Democratic Party (SPD) from 2002 to 2005, followed by Gerhard Botz of the SPD from 2005 to 2009. Carola Stauche of the Christian Democratic Union (CDU) was representative from 2009 to 2017. Albert Weiler was elected in the 2017 election. The constituency was won by Michael Kaufmann of the Alternative for Germany (AfD) in 2021.

Election results

2021 election

2017 election

2013 election

2009 election

Notes

References

Federal electoral districts in Thuringia
2002 establishments in Germany
Constituencies established in 2002
Saalfeld-Rudolstadt
Saale-Holzland-Kreis
Saale-Orla-Kreis